Egelund House (Danish: Egelund Slot) is a former royal residence built by Queen Dowager Louise Josephine from 1915 to 1917 on the road between Hillerød and Fredensborg, near the village of Nødebo and the southern tip of Lake Esrom, 35 km north of Copenhagen, Denmark. Today it is owned by Dansk Arbejdsgiverforening and used as a congress and training centre.

History
Queen Louise Josephine Consort of King  Frederik VIII of Denmark, was widowed in 1912. From 1915 to 1917 the house was built and she took up residence there.

The architect was Carl Harild and the garden was designed by landscape architect Edvard Glæsel and later J. P. Andersen as well as Egelund's resident gardener Hansen. After the queen's death in 1926, the property was inherited by Prince Gustav of Denmark, who remained unmarried and had no children. After his death in 1944, the estate passed to Knud, Hereditary Prince of Denmark and Princess Caroline-Mathilde of Denmark. In 1954 Dansk Arbejdsgiverforening bought Egelund from the heirs to use it as a congress and training venue.

See also
 Residences of the Danish monarch

References

External links
 Official website

Royal residences in Denmark
Houses in Hillerød Municipality
Houses completed in 1917
National Romantic architecture in Denmark
Houses in Denmark
Art Nouveau houses